Murad Magomedov (born 25 September 1973) is a Russian-Azerbaijani-Israeli former football player. He also holds an Israeli identity card, what allowed him to play as a non-foreign player. He is currently the assistant of Maccabi Petah Tikva and in April 2012 came back from retirement.

Early life 
Murad was born in Makhachkala, Soviet Russia, to a Kumyk family.

Honours
Toto Cup:
Winner (2): 1999–00, 2003–04
Israel State Cup:
Runner-up (1): 2001
Israeli Premier League:
Runner-up (1): 2004–05

References

External links
Stats at One

1973 births
Living people
Association football defenders
Soviet footballers
Russian footballers
Russian expatriate footballers
Kumyks
Russia youth international footballers
FC Zhemchuzhina Sochi players
Russian Premier League players
Israeli people of Dagestani descent
Israeli Premier League players
Liga Leumit players
Maccabi Petah Tikva F.C. players
Expatriate footballers in Israel
Russian expatriate sportspeople in Israel
Footballers from Makhachkala
FC Dynamo Makhachkala players